Nine Corner Lake is a lake that is located northwest of Canada Lake, New York. Fish species present in the lake are brook trout, black bullhead, yellow perch, and pumpkinseed sunfish. There is carry down access via trail off CR-29A.

References

Lakes of New York (state)
Lakes of Fulton County, New York